Arthur Debruyckere (13 February 1915 – 4 August 1955) was a French racing cyclist. He rode in the 1935 Tour de France.

References

1915 births
1955 deaths
French male cyclists
Place of birth missing